The Taipei Metro Luzhou station is the terminal station on the Luzhou Line, located in Luzhou, New Taipei, Taiwan.

Station overview

This two-level, underground station is located at the intersection of Sanmin Road and Zhongzheng Road and opened on 3 November 2010. It is the busiest station on the Luzhou Line, handling over 19,000 passengers per day two weeks after opening, and increasing to over 28,700 per day by the end of November 2010.

Construction
Excavation depth for the station is around 24 meters. The station is 216 meters in length and 21 meters in width. It has three entrances, one elevator for the disabled, and two vent shafts.

Public Artwork
The theme for the station is "Dancing in the Wind", part of a common theme of egrets for the Luzhou Branch Line. The main lobby features a dome skylight with a piece of public art resembling a dancing egret feather. Natural light from above makes the feather art appear light and soft.

Station layout

Exits
Exit 1: Sanmin Rd.
Exit 2: Metro Plaza 
Exit 3: Zhongzheng Rd.

Around the station
 National Police Agency New Taipei, Luzhou Branch
 National Open University
 Lujiang Junior High School - exit 4
 Zhongyi Elementary School
 Renai Elementary School
Luzhou Civil Sport Center
Uniqlo
Luzhou Bus Terminal
The Luzhou Lee Family Historic Estate

References

Zhonghe–Xinlu line stations
Railway stations opened in 2010